The Canada Centre Building in Scarborough, Toronto, houses the offices of Service Canada, Human Resources and Social Development Canada, Passport Canada and the Canada Revenue Agency. Sandwiched between the Scarborough Civic Centre and Scarborough Town Centre shopping mall, the building was completed in 1986. Its opening came shortly after the opening of the Scarborough RT the preceding year, and it is easily accessible from Scarborough Centre RT station.

Canadian federal government buildings
Office buildings completed in 1986
Buildings and structures in Scarborough, Toronto

fr:Édifice du gouvernement du Canada à Scarborough